Ocker is a surname. Notable people with the surname include:

 Christopher Ocker, American historian
 Sheldon Ocker (born 1942), American sportswriter
 William C. Ocker (1880–1942), American aviator

See also
 Ockers